Stoycho Mladenov Jr. (born 19 June 1985) is a former Bulgarian football player, who played as a midfielder.

He started his career in CSKA Sofia. He played for a few clubs, including Naftex Burgas, Lokomotiv Mezdra and FC Vihren Sandanski. He is the son of Stoycho Mladenov, a famous Bulgarian football player and manager.

References

External links
 Mladenov at football24.bg

Bulgarian footballers
1985 births
Living people
Footballers from Sofia
Association football midfielders
First Professional Football League (Bulgaria) players
PFC Lokomotiv Mezdra players
Neftochimic Burgas players
OFC Vihren Sandanski players
PFC Minyor Pernik players
Akademik Sofia players
FC Sportist Svoge players
PFC Beroe Stara Zagora players
FC Etar 1924 Veliko Tarnovo players
FC Lokomotiv 1929 Sofia players